Deadwater(s) or Dead water may refer to:

Places
 Deadwater, Hampshire, village in England
 Deadwater, Northumberland, village in England
 Deadwater railway station, a closed railway station
 Deadwaters, South Lanarkshire, a village in Scotland; See List of places in South Lanarkshire
 Deadwater Ait, island in the River Thames near Windsor, Berkshire, England

Other uses
 Deadwater (film), horror film
 Deadwater (topography), part of an estuary through which there is little to no water flow
 Dead water, nautical term when a layer of fresh water rests on top of denser salt water, without mixing
 dead water caused by low oxygen levels in aquatic environments